There are several notable people with the surname Orenstein.
 Alexander Jeremiah Orenstein, South African medical scientist and army general
 Henry Orenstein, American poker player and entrepreneur
 Henry Orenstein (painter), Canadian artist
 Howard Orenstein, American lawyer and politician
 Joan Orenstein, Canadian actress
 Leo Orenstein, Canadian television producer and director
 Peggy Orenstein, American writer
 Toby Orenstein, an American theatrical director, producer, and educator
 Tomer Orenstein, Israeli musician
 Walter Orenstein, American vaccinologist
 Zigu Ornea (born Orenstein or Ornstein), Romanian cultural historian

See also
 Orenstein and Koppel
 Ornstein

Jewish surnames